Union Flat, California may refer to:
Union Flat, Amador County, California
Union Flat, El Dorado County, California